The sandhill dunnart (Sminthopsis psammophila) is a species of small carnivorous Australian marsupial of the family Dasyuridae. It is known from four scattered arid areas of Australia: near Lake Amadeus in Northern Territory, the central Eyre Peninsula in South Australia, the southwestern edge of the Great Victoria Desert in Western Australia, and at Yellabinna in South Australia.

Description
Sandhill dunnarts are most commonly known as the marsupial mouse and they are usually 10 to 16 cm long. Most dunnarts have fine gray or black fur. They also have large ears and thick tails with short stiff hairs. It is known that the dunnart stores all its fat in its tail.
They usually move about by running smoothly on all four legs, sometimes with sudden short stops, during which they often squat with the forebody slightly elevated.

The sandhill dunnart is the second largest of the 19 dunnart (Sminthopsis) species, with an adult body mass of 35g (females) to 44g (males); only the Julia Creek dunnart (S. douglasi; 40–70 g) is larger. Their thermoneutral body temperature is around (34.4 °C.) Penile morphology and molecular biology suggest that the Sandhill dunnart is a basal Sminthopsis, without a clear relationship to any other species. The Sandhill Dunnart's physiology also resembles that of other dunnarts.

The sandhill dunnart is so rare, little is known about its appearance. At around 1 to 2 inches, it is very small.
It is one of the largest and rarest of all dunnarts. It is coloured grey to buff and is found in low parallel sand dunes, particularly near hummock grass.

Behaviour and diet
The sandhill dunnart is one of the largest species of dunnarts, weighing in from 30 to 55 g. One might assume that the size would result in a fondness for larger invertebrates, but it is recorded that the medium-sized marsupial prefers to eat smaller prey, such as ants, beetles, spiders, grasshoppers, termites, wasps and centipedes. The species is known to be generalist feeders and extremely opportunistic. Being a voracious predator, its diet remains high in all seasons, varying only slightly in proportion.

In severe conditions when food is scarce, the dunnart enters short and shallow periods of torpor. The species’ documented states of mental and physical inactivity helps it to conserve water and energy. From an analysis of the sandhill dunnart's metabolic, thermal, and ventilatory physiology, the organism's body temperature ranges, including thermoneutral, thermolability below thermoneutral, and mild hyperthermia temperatures are typical of those seen in small dunnarts and dasyurids.

Reproduction
Sandhill dunnarts typically begin breeding in September, with offspring born from September to October. There have been sites where young dunnarts were found in October and April. This information may suggest that with the right conditions in a good season, dunnarts may be able to produce another litter. There is a sixteen- to nineteen-day interval between mating and birth.

Sexual maturity for both the male and female dunnart is reached by one year of age. The age at which dunnarts are no longer able to reproduce is undetermined. Cases have been recorded of male dunnarts in captivity that continued to breed at five years of age, and female dunnarts in captivity that continued to breed at three years of age.

Habitat
The sandhill dunnart can be found in sandy, arid and semi-arid regions with spinifex grass hummocks in Australia. Because of the dunnart's distinct and limited habitat needs, spinifex hummocks are an essential part of its environment. It takes shelter from extreme temperatures and humidity within the burrows it digs under larger spinifex hummocks, which range from about 12 to 110 centimeters in length and are up to 46 centimeters deep. Females occasionally dig deeper, creating a chamber typically used for raising their young. Males, however, are known to occupy small burrows dug between spinifex clumps, hollow logs and even burrows dug by other animal species.

With the continual decrease of the spinifex hummock, the species’ territory also decreases and is now currently restricted to Eyre Peninsula in South Australia,  and Great Victoria Desert covering South and Western Australia. It was first sighted in Northern Territory, but it has not been seen there since the late 19th century.

Threats
Although the exact causes of the decline of the Sandhill Dunnart are not known, it is likely to be under threat from predation by introduced species such as Red foxes and Feral cats, habitat degradation due to livestock grazing, and inappropriate fire regimes. But despite the great damage done to their habitat by the fire regimes, sandhill dunnarts are able to recolonize burnt areas because of their adaptation to mid-successional complexes of vegetation. However, a single fire can wipe out an entire population. As the remnants become increasingly isolated from one another, the lack of connective bush corridors greatly reduces the likelihood of recolonisation. They are a major threat to this species because of its dependence on large spinifex hummocks. In addition, land clearance for agriculture at the Eyre Peninsula has caused a great reduction in viable habitat for the sandhill dunnart, leaving only 43 percent of the area's original vegetation remaining.

Conservation status
The sandhill dunnart is listed as “vulnerable” under the Environment Protection and Biodiversity Conservation Act 1999. It is afforded some protection within reserves, such as the Ironstone Hill Conservation Park and the Yellabinna Wilderness Protection Area in South Australia, and the Queen Victoria Spring Nature Reserve in Western Australia. In 2001, a national recovery plan listing several actions to aid in the recovery of the species was published. These actions included preventing further habitat clearance, conducting surveys in areas likely to support the species, implementing monitoring programs for key populations, and conducting research on captive individuals to increase understanding of this species’ reproductive biology. Experimental burns were also recommended to encourage the growth of suitable spinifex habitat.

References

External links
Threatened Species of the Northern Territory: Sandhill Dunnart

Dasyuromorphs
Endangered fauna of Australia
Mammals of Western Australia
Mammals of South Australia
Mammals of the Northern Territory
Marsupials of Australia
Mammals described in 1895